Catholicism primarily designates the faith, doctrine, practice and system of the Catholic Church. It may also refer to:

 Catholicity, the core set of beliefs of various Christian denominations

 Christian denominations and movements including:
 Anglo-Catholicism, a religious movement of the Anglican Communion
 Affirming Catholicism, a religious movement within the Anglican Communion
 Black Catholicism, the expression of the Catholic Church among African Americans
 Eastern Catholicism, Eastern rite particular churches of the Catholic Church, in full communion with the Pope in Rome
 Greek Catholicism, Eastern Catholic Churches that follow the Byzantine Rite (a.k.a. Greek Rite)
 Syriac Catholicism, Eastern Catholic Churches that follow the Syriac Rite
 Folk Catholicism, a religious and social movement within the Catholic Church
 Independent Catholicism, an independent sacramental movement originally from the Catholic Church
 Old Catholicism, Western churches which separated from the see of Rome after the First Vatican council of 1869–70
 Liberal Catholicism, the liberal branch within the Catholic Church
 National Catholicism, a nationalist branch within the Catholic Church in Francoist Spain
 Political Catholicism, the political and social doctrines of the Catholic Church
 Traditionalist Catholicism, a conservative religious movement within Catholicism
 Western Catholicism or Latin Catholicism

See also
 Catholic (disambiguation)
 Catholic Church (disambiguation)